Titi Kuti  is a Nigerian actor, film producer, model, and television host, well known for his role on King of Boys: The Return of the King.

Biography
Titilope Kuti was born in Lagos and grew-up between Lagos Island, and Surulere. He is of the Ransome-Kuti family.

He graduated with a B.Sc in Industrial Relations and Personnel Management from Lagos State University. Kuti made his first debut as a model, in 2005, while he was an undergraduate, he became the face of MTN Nigeria, and Conoil on billboards. Shortly after, he modeled for The St Moritz style awards, and Benson & Hedges, on the runway. Before venturing into the media industry, Kuti, began working with Nigezie, where he learned production and media from the VMN crew, and the managing director of Virtual Media Network, Femi Aderibigbe.

Kuti worked as Nigezie TV presenter, producer, and resource person with the channel communications department. In 2009, he became the host of The Top Ten Countdown Show on Nigezie Xtreme (formally Nigezie TV), a music countdown show which he later served as the producer of The Top Ten Countdown Show. In 2010, he filmed his first TV series titled Emerald. In 2018, he played a minor role as Ade Tiger, on Netflix Original King of Boys, and returned back on screen in 2021, with a major role on the Netflix Original series King of Boys: The Return of the King. On 7 December 2021, he covered The Will Downtown Magazine's issue 43, volume 1. In January 2022, Stakers Championship reality TV show, unveiled Kuti, as one of its co-host, alongside Uti Nwachukwu, and Liquorose.

He has produced several Television shows, and movies; including,  Glo Naija Sings, Nigerian Idol, Nigeria's Got Talent (seasons 1 and 2), Football legends Nigeria and Tecno Own The Stage, reality show. Kuti transitioned from a model into a film producer and debuted his first production for M-Net television series Hustle, which he successfully produced its 3 seasons, for Africa Magic from 2016 to 2018 and later joined Smart Media Production as an associate producer for a reality show Looking for Love Naija in 2018.

Filmography
List of filmographies by Titi Kuti.

Television

Other productions

See also
 List of Nigerian actors
 List of Nigerian film producers

References

External links
 

Yoruba male actors
Nigerian male film actors
Male actors in Yoruba cinema
21st-century Nigerian male actors
Year of birth missing (living people)
Living people
Nigerian male television actors
Nigerian television presenters
Nigerian male models
Nigerian television personalities
Nigerian film producers
Lagos State University alumni
Nigerian media personalities
Ransome-Kuti family
Male actors from Lagos